Robert William Jensen (born July 14, 1958) is a former professor of journalism from the University of Texas at Austin. From 1992 to 2018 he taught graduate and undergraduate courses in media law, ethics, and politics.

He has focused much of his work on the critique of pornography and of masculinity, developed in his 2017 book, The End of Patriarchy: Radical Feminism for Men. He also has written about white privilege and institutional racism. He also sits on the editorial board of the academic journal Sexualization, Media, and Society.

Early life
Jensen grew up in Fargo, North Dakota.

Education 
In 1981, he received a Bachelor of Science degree from Moorhead State University (now Minnesota State University, Moorhead), and in 1985, he received a Master of Arts degree in journalism and public affairs from American University. In 1992 he completed his Ph.D. in media law and ethics in the School of Journalism and Mass Communication at the University of Minnesota.

Career and activism 
Prior to his academic career, he worked as a reporter and copy editor for several newspapers, including the St. Petersburg Times and the St. Paul Pioneer Press.

Jensen writes for popular media, both alternative and mainstream. His opinion and analytic pieces on such subjects as foreign policy, politics, and race have appeared in papers around the U.S. He also is involved in a number of activist groups, including the Third Coast Activist Resource Center.

Controversy

9/11 opinion piece
Jensen wrote an opinion piece for the Houston Chronicle on September 14, 2001, shortly after the September 11th terrorist attacks. In the piece, Jensen wrote that the September 11th terrorist attacks were "reprehensible and indefensible" but "no more despicable than the massive acts of terrorism – the deliberate killing of civilians for political purposes – that the U.S. government has committed during my lifetime."

Jensen's piece drew both praise and criticism. Some individuals demanded that The University of Texas fire Jensen. In response, University of Texas President Larry Faulkner wrote in a letter to the editor published in the Houston Chronicle that he was "disgusted by Jensen's article" and called Jensen "a fountain of undiluted foolishness on issues of public policy."

Views on transgender identity 
In early July 2014, MonkeyWrench Books collective cut all ties with Jensen over his article reviewing two feminist books that critiqued transgender identity. These books were Sheila Jeffreys' Gender Hurts: A Feminist Analysis of the Politics of Transgenderism and Michael Schwalbe's Manhood Acts: Gender and the Practices of Domination. In the review published by Dissident Voice, Jensen concluded that, "On the surface, transgenderism may seem to be a more revolutionary approach, but radical feminism offers a deeper critique of the domination/subordination dynamic at the heart of patriarchy and a more promising path to liberation" which they felt "contributes to a dangerous culture of transphobia". In addition, Dexter M. Thomas wrote a rebuttal which was also published by Dissident Voice. Jensen responded by writing a follow-up article which elaborated on his views on the ecological and social implications of what he terms "trans ideology".

Personal life 
Jensen identifies as a radical Christian who rejects the supernatural claims of Christian orthodoxy.  Jensen is married to musician Eliza Gilkyson.

Selected works

Books 
 
 
 
 
 
 
 
 
 
 
 __ (2017). The End of Patriarchy: Radical Feminism for Men. Spinifex Press .
 __ (2021). The Restless and Relentless Mind of Wes Jackson: Searching for Sustainability. University Press of Kansas.
 (2022) An Inconvenient Apocalypse: Environmental Collapse, Climate Crisis, and the Fate of Humanity co-authored with Wes Jackson.

Book chapters

Journal articles 
 
 
 
 
 
 
 
 
 
 
 
Review of:  
 
 
 
 
 
Review of: 
  Pdf.

Films 
  55 mins
  46 mins

Speeches 
  
  Recording by Global Voices for Justice.

Press 
  (one hour)

References

External links
 Robert Jensen homepage, with article archive.
 The Rag Blog, articles by Robert Jensen.

1958 births
Living people
21st-century American male writers
21st-century American non-fiction writers
Academics from North Dakota
Activists from North Dakota
American anti-capitalists
American feminist writers
American male non-fiction writers
American media critics
American political writers
Anti-pornography feminists
American anti-racism activists
Christian radicals
Feminist studies scholars
Male feminists
North Dakota socialists
Radical feminists
University of Minnesota School of Journalism and Mass Communication alumni
University of Texas at Austin faculty
Writers from North Dakota
Feminism and transgender